The 1977 Belgian motorcycle Grand Prix was the ninth round of the 1977 Grand Prix motorcycle racing season. It took place on 3 July 1977 at the Circuit de Spa-Francorchamps. Barry Sheene won the race with an average speed of 135.0 mph making it the fastest motorcycle Grand Prix in history.

500cc classification

250 cc classification

125 cc classification

50 cc classification

Sidecar classification

References

Belgian motorcycle Grand Prix
Belgian
Motorcycle Grand Prix